Muroc (also, Rogers, Rod, Yucca, and Rodriguez) is a former settlement in Kern County, California in the Mojave Desert.

Muroc still appeared on maps as of 1942. Muroc's site is now on Edwards Air Force Base. After World War II Muroc served as an important test flight location; in 1947 Chuck Yeager broke the sound barrier in the Muroc vicinity.

A post office operated at Muroc from 1910 to 1951. The name honors early settlers Ralph and Clifford Corum — their surname spelled backwards is "Muroc".

See also
Muroc Army Air Field

References

Former settlements in Kern County, California
Populated places in the Mojave Desert
Former populated places in California
Edwards Air Force Base